State Highway 39 is the longest known highway in the Visakhapatnam District of Andhra Pradesh. It connects Visakhapatnam and Araku.

Route

It connects the tourist destinations in Visakhapatnam district of Andhra Pradesh like Araku and Borra Caves. It covers a distance of 112 km from Araku to Vizag.

Visakhapatnam→Kottavalasa→Srungavarapukota→Araku

See also
 List of State Highways in Andhra Pradesh

References

Transport in Visakhapatnam
State Highways in Andhra Pradesh
Roads in Vizianagaram district
Roads in Visakhapatnam district